Trade Winds, White Noise is Tim Hecker's second release. It was released on July 1, 2002 and distributed with copies of the 107th issue of Parachute Magazine.

Track listing

External links
Trade Winds, White Noise on Discogs
Trade Winds, White Noise on MusicBrainz

2002 albums
Tim Hecker albums